La Llorona ('The Weeping Woman' or 'the Cryer') is an oral legend in Latin American folklore.

La Llorona may also refer to:

Film
 La Llorona (1933 film), a Mexican film based on the legend
 La Llorona (1960 film), a Mexican film based on the legend
 La Llorona (2019 film), a Guatemalan film

Music
 "La Llorona" (song), a Mexican folk song covered by many artists
 La Llorona (Lhasa de Sela album), 1997
 La Llorona (Chavela Vargas album)

Other uses
 "La Llorona" (Grimm), a 2012 episode of the TV series

See also
 
 Weeping Woman (disambiguation)
 The Woman in White (disambiguation)
 La leyenda de la Llorona, a 2011 Mexican animated film 
 La maldición de la llorona, a 1961 Mexican horror film
 The Curse of La Llorona, a 2019 American horror film